MOVE is a geologic modelling software released in September 2008. It provides a full digital environment for best practice structural modelling to reduce risk and uncertainty in geological models. The MOVE suite also provides a platform for integrating and interpreting data, cross-section construction, 3D model building, kinematic restoration and validation, geomechanical modelling, fracture modelling, fault response modelling, and fault and stress analysis.

MOVE 2019.1 was released on 8 November 2019 and includes substantial new features, as well as improvements to the existing functionality and usability. 

The software suite consists of the following modules:

·        MOVE core

·        2D Kinematic Modelling

·        3D Kinematic Modelling

·        Geomechanical Modelling

·        Fracture Modelling

·        Stress Analysis

·        Fault Analysis

·        Fault Response Modelling

·        Sediment Modelling

·        MOVELink

Petroleum Experts have also developed two free field mapping apps for both tablets and phones; FieldMOVE (Android, iOS and Windows tablets) and FieldMOVE Clino (Android and iOS phones)

References

Geology software